William Abbott was a footballer who played in the Football League for Derby County.

References

English footballers
Chesterfield F.C. players
Derby County F.C. players
English Football League players
Year of death missing
19th-century births
Association football outside forwards